Ljubić is a Slavic surname.

People with the name
 Božo Ljubić (born 1949), Croat politician of Bosnia and Herzegovina
 Ivan Ljubic (born 1996), Austrian footballer
 Rajko Ljubič, Bačkan ethnic Croat film director from Serbia
 Šime Ljubić (1822–1896), Austrian Croat theologian, archeologist, and historian
 Stjepan Ljubić (1906–1986), Yugoslav Olympic cyclist
 Tatjana Majcen Ljubič, Slovenian Paralympian athlete

See also
 Ljubić (disambiguation)

Slavic-language surnames